Louis-Onésime Loranger (April 7, 1837 – August 18, 1917) was a Canadian lawyer, politician, and judge.

Born in Yamachiche, Lower Canada, the son of Joseph Loranger and Marie-Louise Dugal, Loranger was educated in Montreal at the Petit Séminaire de Montréal and studied law at the Collège Sainte-Marie. He was called to the Bar of Lower Canada in 1858 and practiced law with his brothers, Thomas-Jean-Jacques and Jean-Marie. He was made a Queen's Counsel in 1881.

He was first elected to the Legislative Assembly of Quebec for the electoral district of Laval in the 1875 election. A Conservative, he was re-elected in 1881. From 1879 to 1882, he was the attorney general in the cabinet of Premier Joseph-Adolphe Chapleau. He was also a member of the Montreal City Council for the ward of Saint-Louis from 1871 to 1877. He was president of the Saint-Jean-Baptiste Society of Montreal from 1895 to 1899.

In 1882, he was appointed a judge in the Superior Court of Quebec for the district of Montreal. He retired in 1909.

References
 
 

1837 births
1917 deaths
Montreal city councillors
Conservative Party of Quebec MNAs
Judges in Quebec
Lawyers in Quebec
Canadian deists
Canadian King's Counsel
Burials at Notre Dame des Neiges Cemetery